Gruhalakshmi or Grihalaxmi may refer to: 
 Grihalaxmi (1934 film), a Hindi social family melodrama film
 Gruhalakshmi (1938 film), an Indian Telugu-language drama film
 Gruhalakshmi (1955 film), an Indian Tamil-language film
 Gruhalakshmi (1967 film), a Telugu-language comedy film